was a Japanese triple jumper who competed in the 1972 Summer Olympics and in the 1976 Summer Olympics.

References

1951 births
1993 deaths
Japanese male triple jumpers
Olympic male triple jumpers
Olympic athletes of Japan
Athletes (track and field) at the 1972 Summer Olympics
Athletes (track and field) at the 1976 Summer Olympics
Asian Games gold medalists for Japan
Asian Games gold medalists in athletics (track and field)
Athletes (track and field) at the 1974 Asian Games
Medalists at the 1974 Asian Games
Japan Championships in Athletics winners
20th-century Japanese people